Labidi may refer to:
Khemais Labidi, Tunisian footballer
Massin Kevin Labidi, atheist activist
Meherzia Labidi Maïza, Tunisian politician
Mohsen Labidi, Tunisian footballer
Nadia Labidi, Algerian filmmaker
Najma Kousri Labidi, Tunisian activist
Samir Labidi, Tunisian politician
Sofiane Labidi, Tunisian footballer
Wahid Labidi
Zakarie Labidi, French footballer